Robert James Roy Campbell (1813 – 7 June 1862) was a British Liberal and Whig politician.

Campbell was first elected Whig MP for Weymouth and Melcombe Regis at the 1857 general election, and held the seat until 1859, when he stood as a Liberal but was defeated.

References

External links
 

Whig (British political party) MPs for English constituencies
UK MPs 1857–1859
1813 births
1862 deaths